Alexander Garden ( – 1756) was a Scottish Episcopalian priest, educated at the University of Aberdeen. In 1719 he went to South Carolina, then part of the American Colonies, as the Bishop of London's Commissary, and became rector of St. Philip's Church in Charleston. He was a prominent figure in the early history of Charleston, known then as Charles Town. Garden is often remembered for his efforts to censor the evangelist George Whitefield and prevent his "enthusiastic" type of religious meetings from being held in Charles Town, SC.

As well as supervising other clergymen in the area he took an interest in the Charleston Free School, and established the so-called "Negro School" which was supported by the Church of England's Society for the Propagation of the Gospel. In the spring of 1754 he retired and went to live in England, but soon went back to the warmer climate of South Carolina and died there in 1756.

See also
 Alexander Garden (naturalist)

References

Sources
  William Howland Kenney, III.  ″Alexander Garden and George Whitefield: The Significance of Revivalism in South Carolina 1738-1741″. The South Carolina Historical Magazine, Vol. 71, No. 1 (January 1970), pp. 1–16.
  William Buell Sprague. Annals of the American Episcopal pulpit. London:, n.p.?, 1859.

External links
Sermon by Garden, 1740
St. Philip's Church history

1680s births
1756 deaths
18th-century American Episcopal priests
18th-century Scottish Episcopalian priests
Alumni of the University of Aberdeen
British-American culture in South Carolina
British North American Anglicans
Clergy from Edinburgh
Clergy from Charleston, South Carolina
People of pre-statehood South Carolina
Pre-statehood history of South Carolina
Religious leaders from South Carolina
Scottish emigrants to the United States
South Carolina colonial people